The 1990–91 Duke Blue Devils men's basketball team was a Division I college basketball team that competed in the Atlantic Coast Conference. The team brought to Duke their first national championship when they defeated Kansas 72–65. Duke would win the championship again the following year, making Duke the first team since UCLA in 1973 to win back-to-back titles.

Roster

Expectations
The Blue Devils had ended the 1990 season with a record-setting 30-point loss to the UNLV Runnin' Rebels in the national championship game (103–73). After losing seniors Phil Henderson, Alaa Abdelnaby, and Robert Brickey to graduation, Duke welcomed a new addition to the team, freshman Grant Hill.

Regular season
With junior Christian Laettner and sophomore Bobby Hurley leading the way, Duke placed third at the Preseason NIT (behind Arizona and Arkansas). The Blue Devils went on to compile a 25–6 regular season record, including a perfect 16–0 mark at home. Scoring victories in both rivalry matches against North Carolina and sporting an 11–3 conference record, Duke also captured their 9th regular-season championship in school history.

Conference tournament
Duke entered the ACC tournament as a No. 1 seed, but stumbled in the ACC title game against North Carolina by a score of 96–74, even though the Blue Devils had defeated the Tar Heels twice during the regular season. As a result, North Carolina received the top seed in the East Regional, leaving Duke with a No. 2 seed in the Midwest Regional of the NCAA tournament.

NCAA tournament
Duke however tore through the Midwest Regional, defeating St. John's to join UNLV, Kansas, and rival North Carolina in the Final Four in Indianapolis. Entering the semifinal game against UNLV, the Blue Devils were facing an undefeated and top-ranked Runnin' Rebels squad that boasted a 45-game winning streak and featured National Player of the Year Larry Johnson. In one of the biggest upsets in Final Four history, however, Duke got its revenge from a year ago by a score of 79–77 after Laettner hit two free throws with 12 seconds remaining and UNLV guard Anderson Hunt missed a three-point attempt at the end-of-game buzzer.

An all-ACC, Duke vs. UNC title game was averted when Roy Williams coached his Kansas Jayhawks team to victory over his mentor Dean Smith and his Tar Heels squad. In what would become the first of many matchups between Williams (later head coach at North Carolina until his retirement in 2021) and Mike Krzyzewski, Duke finally claimed its first national championship by a score of 72–65. Laettner was named NCAA basketball tournament Most Outstanding Player.

Schedule

|-
!colspan=8 style=| Regular season

|-
!colspan=8 style=| ACC Tournament

|-
!colspan=8 style=| NCAA Tournament

Accomplishments
1st basketball championship after 4 previous appearances in title game (1964, 1978, 1986, 1990)
2nd straight appearance in national championship game (1990, 1991)
4th straight appearance in Final Four (1988–1991)
Christian Laettner was a consensus All-American Second Team selection.
Three players received All-ACC honors:
Christian Laettner (1st Team)
Bobby Hurley, Thomas Hill (3rd Team)
Three players from the 1991 squad (Laettner, Hurley, and Grant Hill) had their jerseys retired by Duke.

References

External links
Duke Blue Devils Basketball Statistical Database
Coach K's 1991 Blue Devils win championship
Crowning Moments in the Queen City: National Champions Not Always ACC Champions (1991–1993)

 

Duke Blue Devils men's basketball seasons
Duke Blue Devils
NCAA Division I men's basketball tournament championship seasons
Duke
NCAA Division I men's basketball tournament Final Four seasons
Duke
Duke